Valentinius, a mid-2nd century Gnostic thinker and preacher, was among the early Christians who attempted to align Christianity with middle Platonism.  Valentinius pooled dual concepts from the Platonic world of ideal forms, or fullness (pleroma), and the lower world of phenomena, or emptiness (kenoma, κένωμα).  Employing a third concept of cosmos, what is manifest, Valentinian initiates could exegete scripture in light of these three aspects of correlated existence.

The void

The ancient Greek term for emptiness or void (kenoma), as pertaining to Theodotus's exegesis of Gospel of John chapter 1 verse 3, is described in The Excerpta ex Theodoto of Clement of Alexandria (Casey, 1934).

Hysterema
Elsewhere, the usual antithesis to Pleroma is not Kenoma, but Hysterema (ὑστέρημα). As the system is reported by Hippolytus (vi. 31, p. 180) this word is used as the complement of the word Pleroma, denoting all that is not included in the meaning of the latter word. Thus the Horos or boundary is described as separating the Hysterema from the Pleroma, itself partaking of the nature of both; but preserving all inside fixed and immovable by permitting nothing from without to enter. We can understand in the same sense the passage in Epiphanius (Haer. 31, 4, p. 166), where the same name is given to the Demiurge; for it appears in the case of the word Hebdomas that the Valentinians gave to the Demiurge the name of the realm over which he ruled, and from which he had his origin.

Marcus speaks of the Demiurge as karpos hysterematos (Iren. I. xvii. 2, p. 86; xix. 1, p. 90), probably, as Lightfoot suggests (Coloss. p. 335), in contrast with the description of the Christ as karpos pleromatos. Marcus would seem to have used the word Hysterema, in the sense already explained, to denote the region outside the Pleroma (see Iren. I. xvi. 2, p. 82), where, in his usual way of finding mysteries in numbers, he regards the former region as symbolised by the numbers up to 99 counted on the left hand, the latter by 100 counted on the right hand. As Marcus uses the word Pleroma in the plural number, so (see Lightfoot, l. c.) he may have used Hysterema also in the plural number to denote the powers belonging to these regions respectively. But it seems to us likely that the assertion that Marcus counted a second or a third Hysterema is but an inference drawn by Irenaeus himself (I. xvi. 3, p. 83), from the fact that he found the name karpos hysterematos applied not only to the Demiurge, but to his mother, Sophia Achamoth.

Irenaeus ordinarily uses the word, usually rendered labes by the old Latin translator, in no technical sense, but with the general meaning of defect, commonly joining it with the words agnoia and pathos. The word Hysterema is found also in Excerpt. Theod. 2, 22 (Clem. Alex. pp. 967, 974), in the latter passage in a technical sense; but the context does not enable us to fix its meaning. Hysterema is said by Epiphanius (Haer. 24, p. 74) to have been used as a technical word by Basilides.

See also
Dyad (Greek philosophy)
Tzimtzum

References

The Excerpta ex Theodoto of Clement of Alexandria, ed., transl., and intro. by R.P. Casey (London, 1934).

Attribution

Gnosticism